Argo is an unincorporated community or a siding administered by the rural municipality of Biggar No. 347, in the Canadian province of Saskatchewan.  Argo was located on the Dodsland Branch of the Canadian National Railway between Biggar and Duperow.  The closest town is Biggar to the northeast.  Biggar railway station is a divisional point for the Canadian National Railway (CNR).

Demographics 
The unincorporated area of Argo is enumerated in the rural municipality (RM) of Biggar No. 347, Saskatchewan.  The statistics for the RM show a rural population of 867 residents.

N/A = Data Not Available

See also 
List of communities in Saskatchewan

References 

Biggar No. 347, Saskatchewan
Unincorporated communities in Saskatchewan